Michele Bisi (April 18, 1788 – December 26, 1874) was an Italian engraver and painter born in Genoa. His work is identified with the schools of Bartolozzi, Rosaspina, and Longhi.

Bisi first distinguished himself by the publication of the Pinacoteca del Palazzo Reale delle Scienze e delle Arti di Milano for which he was aided by his brother's wife, Ernesta Legnani Bisi, who, like her husband Giuseppe Bisi, had studied under Giuseppe Longhi. The text was completed by Robustiano Gironi. In 1819 he undertook a series of engravings from the paintings of Andrea Appiani, in which he was assisted by some of the best scholars of Longhi. His engraving of Venus Embracing Cupid  was popular.

Subsequently he made engravings of:
The Virgin and Infant Christ enthroned attended by St. Anthony and St. Barbara, after Luini.
Andromeda and Perseus, after Guercino.
Adoration of the Virgin, after Sassoferrato.
Offering of the Magi, after Gaudenzio Ferrari.

Bisi also succeeded as a painter of landscapes. He died in Milan in 1874.

References

1788 births
1874 deaths
Artists from Genoa
19th-century Italian painters
Italian male painters
Italian engravers
19th-century Italian male artists